VAD  may refer to:

Physiology, medicine etc.
Vascular dementia (VaD), dementia caused by problems in the supply of blood to the brain
Vertebral artery dissection, the development of a flap-like tear in the vertebral artery
Ventricular assist device, a mechanical circulatory device used to replace the function of a failing heart
Vitamin A deficiency, a lack of vitamin A in humans
 Vincristine, Adriamycin (doxorubicin), Dexamethasone; a chemotherapy regimen used for multiple myeloma
Voluntary assisted dying

Other
Voluntary Aid Detachment, a voluntary organisation providing field nursing services in the British Empire
VÄD (vodka), an American vodka
Voice activity detection, a technique in which the presence or absence of human speech is detected
Voice-Activated Dialling, speech recognition to identify the destination for a telephone call in interactive voice response

See also
 Vad (disambiguation)